Dworek may refer to the following places in Poland:
Dworek, Lower Silesian Voivodeship (south-west Poland)
Dworek, Nowy Dwór Gdański County in Pomeranian Voivodeship (north Poland)
Dworek, Sztum County in Pomeranian Voivodeship (north Poland)
Dworek, Warmian-Masurian Voivodeship (north Poland)
Dworek, West Pomeranian Voivodeship (north-west Poland)

See also
 
 Dwór (manor house) or Dworek, a specific type of a Polish manor house